What Is This Country? is the sixth studio album by Canadian country music group Prairie Oyster. It was released by ViK. Recordings on November 10, 1998. The album peaked at number 11 on the RPM Country Albums chart.

Randy Bachman played guitar on the first track, "Canadian Sunrise."

Track listing
"Canadian Sunrise"
"Why Are We Holding On To Nothing"
"Baby Don't Come 'Round Here Anymore"
"No Love Have I"
"Blue Melody"
"Barroom Girls"
"Heaven or Bust"
"One of Those Nights"
"Keep On Dreaming"
"Vine Is Doing Better Than the Tree"
"Change with Time"
"Mean Streak"
"Canadian Sunset"

Chart performance

References

1998 albums
Prairie Oyster albums